Deukom is a provider of digital television for the South African market via IPTV or via satellite, using the Astra 4A satellite at 5° east. The target group are Germans living in South Africa.

History
The transmission of the German-language television takes place since 1 May 1996 via satellite and later on via IPTV, above all in South Africa and Namibia. On April 11, 2016, customers in Namibia were informed by Deukom that German-speaking television will be distributed exclusively by Satelio in the future. Existing customers were switched to Satelio. In South Africa, Deukom also uses Satelio's offer under its own name since May 2016.

Channels

TV

Das Erste
ZDF
3sat
arte
DW-TV
RTL Television
RTL II
Sat.1
ProSieben
VOX
n-tv
kabel eins
Puls 4
Heimatkanal
Romance TV
Nitro
Super RTL
ProSieben Maxx
sixx
Jukebox
auto motor und sport channel
Fix und Foxi TV
N24

Radio

Bayern 1
Bayern 3
Klassik Radio
Hitradio Namibia
Antenne Bayern
Radio Paloma
Rock Antenne
harmony.fm
radio ffn
sunshine live

Encryption
Panaccess is used as conditional access system.

References

External links

Television in South Africa
Direct broadcast satellite services
Mass media in Cape Town
1996 establishments in South Africa